André Dias de Escobar (1348–1448) was a Portuguese Benedictine theologian.

Born at Lisbon, Andreas de Escobar joined the Dominicans and then the Augustinians before becoming a Benedictine monk. He became doctor in theology at the University of Vienna in 1393. He became bishop of Ciudad Rodrigo, bishop of Ajaccio in 1422 and bishop of Megara in 1428. He was one of the most widely printed authors of the late fifteenth century. Escobar served as a minor penitentiary in the Apostolic Penitentiary of the Roman curia.

Works
 Lumen confessorum
 Confessio minor seu Modus confitendi
 Confessio maior
 De decimis
 Canones penitentiales

References

1348 births
1448 deaths
University of Vienna alumni
Portuguese theologians
Benedictine theologians
14th-century Portuguese people
15th-century Portuguese people
People from Lisbon
Bishops of Ciudad Rodrigo
Bishops of Ajaccio